A Kalabanda Ate My Homework is a Ugandan animation short film created by Robin Malinga and directed by his blood brother Raymond Malinga. The film stars Martha Kay, Faith Kisa with Patrick Salvador Idringi and Daniel Omara. It tells a story of Tendo a primary school pupil who came to school without her homework and when asked why she didn't hand in her homework, she gives an excuse that a Kalabanda (a mythical creature) ate her homework.

Cast
Patrick Salvador Idringi as the Kalabanda
Martha Kay as Tendo
Faith Kisa as Amiya
Daniel Omara as Mr. Oketch
Kasaija Peter
Seguja Derrick

Reception
The film reception positive reception and has since its release been selected in a number of festivals, nominated for awards and won some. It was selected and screened at the Reanimania Art Festival in Yerevan in Armenia, Cote d’ivore film festival where it won an award for best animation, African Film Festival, Silcon Valley African Film Festival and also received a nomination at the 2017 Uganda Film Festival Awards.

In 2018, Kalabanda won the "Best Creatures Animation" award at Africa International Film Festival in Lagos, Nigeria.

References

External
 

Ugandan animated short films
Films set in Uganda
2017 films
2017 short films
2010s animated short films
2010s English-language films